Vincenzo Valente (21 February 1855 in Corigliano Calabro – 6 September 1921 in Naples) was an Italian composer and writer.  He was known for his Neapolitan songs and for his operettas.

Life
Valente wrote his first piece, "Ntuniella", at the age of 15; this initiated a successful collaboration with Giambattista De Curtis.  He wrote a total of ten operettas, the best known of which was I granatieri of 1889; he also wrote texts for the actor Nicola Maldacea, known for his macchiette; he was most famous, though, for his songs, the most famous of which was "Tiempe belle" of 1916.

Valente was a member of the so-called Società dello Scorfano, an artistic society which ironically emphasized its supporters' brutishness; among its other members was the poet Ferdinando Russo.

Works

Operettas
I granatieri 
Pasquita 
Signorina Capriccio 
L'usignolo 
Vertigini d'amore

Songs
"'A capa femmena"
"Peppì, Comme te voglio amà"
"'E cerase"
"Canzona amirosa"
"I' Pazziava"
"'A galleria nova"
"'A bizzuchella"
"Canzona cafona"
"Cammisa affatata" 
"'O campanello"
"'A sirena"
"Montevergine"
"Notte sul mare"
"'O scuitato"
"'A cammisa"
"Manella mia"
"L'ammore 'n campagna,"
"Tarantella e lariulà"
"'O napulitano a Londra"
"Tiempe belle"
"Jou-jou"
"Bambola"

Bibliography
Luigi De Bartolo – Liliana Misurelli, I suoni dell'anima. Vincenzo Valente interprete del sentimento popolare napoletano, MIT, Cosenza, 2005 
Luigi De Bartolo – Liliana Misurelli, Un ragazzo prodigio – dalla Calabria a Napoli. Aurora, Corigliano Calabro, 2007--Aznesoc 10:21, 28 set 2007 (CEST)

References
This article is based on a translation of the corresponding article in the Italian Wikipedia.

External links
RAI archive of Neapolitan songs

1855 births
1921 deaths
Italian classical composers
Italian male classical composers
Italian male writers
Italian opera composers
Male opera composers
People from Corigliano Calabro
19th-century Italian musicians
19th-century Italian male musicians